Crepidodera nitidula is a species of flea beetle from the Chrysomelidae family that can be found everywhere in Europe except for Albania, Andorra, Croatia, Greece, Ireland, Liechtenstein, San Marino, Spain, Vatican City, and various European islands.

References

Beetles described in 1758
Beetles of Europe
Alticini
Taxa named by Carl Linnaeus